Chowilla Game Reserve is a protected area covering the floodplain on the north side of the River Murray in South Australia from about  north-east of Renmark to the New South Wales border.  It was proclaimed 8 April 1993 in conjunction with the Chowilla Regional Reserve, after a community consultation process which recommended that "hunting of waterfowl be a permitted activity in selected areas of the Chowilla floodplain".  The game reserve is classified as an IUCN Category VI protected area.

The Chowilla floodplain is also protected as part of the Riverland Ramsar site, designated by the Ramsar Convention as a wetland of international importance.

See also
 Chowilla, South Australia
Duck hunting in South Australia 
 List of islands within the Murray River in South Australia
 Riverland Biosphere Reserve

References

External links
Chowilla Game Reserve and Regional Reserve official webpage
Chowilla Game Reserve webpage on protected planet
Chowilla Game Reserve brochure

Game reserves of South Australia
Protected areas established in 1993
1993 establishments in Australia
Murray River